Rideback is a Japanese anime television series based on Tetsurō Kasahara's manga series of the same name. The anime was announced in April 2007. The twelve-episode series was animated by Madhouse and directed by Atsushi Takahashi. It was broadcast on Chiba TV, TV Saitama, tvk, KBS Kyoto, Sun TV, Tokyo MX and AT-X from January 12 to March 30, 2009. Goku.

In North America, Funimation announced the license to the series at Anime Central in May 2010. Funimation released the series on Blu-ray and DVD on June 28, 2011. The series made its American television debut on July 26, 2011, on Funimation Channel.


Episode list

Notes

References

RideBack